Ahmet Mithat Kalabalık (1878–1953) was a Turkish bureaucrat. He was a graduate of the Istanbul University's faculty of law, and served as a member of the Grand National Assembly.

References 

1878 births
1953 deaths
20th-century Turkish politicians
Istanbul University Faculty of Law alumni
Place of death missing
Antisemitism in Turkey
Members of the Grand National Assembly of Turkey
Politicians from Istanbul